The New Mexico Wildcats were a professional indoor football team that played in American Indoor Football (AIF) in the 2008 and 2009 seasons. The team was based in Rio Rancho, New Mexico, with home games played at the Santa Ana Star Center (which was also home of the New Mexico Scorpions of the Central Hockey League).

The franchise was announced in January 2008, as an expansion member of the AIFA.

They won their first game in franchise history on March 30, 2008.

On Wednesday, October 22, 2008, the Wildcats hired Lance Brown as their new head coach.

Season-By-Season 

|-
|2008 || 5 || 9 || 0 || 3rd WC Western || --
|-
|2009 || 1 || 13 || 0 || 4th Western || --
|-
!Totals || 6 || 22 || 0
|colspan="2"|

References

External links 
Official Website
Wildcats' 2008 Stats
Press release announcing the team
Wildcats' 2009 Stats

American Indoor Football Association teams
Sports in Rio Rancho, New Mexico
American football teams in New Mexico
American football teams established in 2008
American football teams disestablished in 2009
2008 establishments in New Mexico
2009 disestablishments in New Mexico